Muchacha de barrio (English: Neighborhood Girl) is a Mexican telenovela produced by Ernesto Alonso for Canal de las Estrellas in 1979. Ana Martín, Humberto Zurita and Guillermo Murray star as the protagonists.

Plot 
Laura is a girl's cheerful and lively neighborhood that lives with his mother Rosa and his stepfather Pancho with his accounting studies, Laura gets a job in the newspaper owned by Pablo Moncada and where he works his adoptive son Raul. Laura and Raul are known and they fall in love, but due to various circumstances, including family secrets that come to light have to separate, although in the end you will find true happiness.

Cast 
 Ana Martín as Laura
 Kitty de Hoyos as Susana / La Chata
 Guillermo Murray as Pablo Moncada
 Magda Guzmán as Rosa
 Sergio Jiménez asPancho
 René Casados as Ernesto Moncada
 Humberto Zurita as Raúl Moncada
 Nubia Martí as Denis
 Tony Bravo as Norberto
 Patricia Rivera as Elena
 Ana Laura Maldonado as Deborah
 Martha Zavaleta as Delfina
 Ernesto Bañuelos as Juan Morales "Joao"
 Jorge del Campo as Víctor
 Héctor Flores as Dr. Galindo
 Oscar Morelli as Eugenio

References

External links 

Muchacha de barrio at the Alma Latina Database

Mexican telenovelas
1979 telenovelas
Televisa telenovelas
1979 Mexican television series debuts
1980 Mexican television series endings
Spanish-language telenovelas